Zero K is a 2016 novel by American author Don DeLillo.

Plot summary
The novel concerns a billionaire, Ross Lockhart, who is inspired by the terminal illness of his wife Artis to seek immortality for both of them through cryopreservation. The novel is narrated by Ross' son, Jeffrey. DeLillo has described Zero K as 'a leap out of the bare-skinned narratives of Point Omega and The Body Artist.'

Reception
Zero K received positive reviews from critics.

Audiobook
The audiobook is read by Thomas Sadoski.

Television adaptation
In March 2017, filmmaker Charlie McDowell announced he was adapting Zero K as a limited series for FX with Noah Hawley and Scott Rudin producing.

References

2016 American novels
Novels about death
Novels by Don DeLillo
Charles Scribner's Sons books
Cryonics in fiction